"Redneck Girl" is a song written by David Bellamy, and recorded by American country music duo The Bellamy Brothers.  It was released in September 1982 as the first single from the album Strong Weakness.  The song was the sixth number one country hit for The Bellamy Brothers.  The single went to number one for one week and spent a total of twelve weeks on the country chart.

Cover versions
Blake Shelton covered the song on the soundtrack to The Dukes of Hazzard: The Beginning.
Tim McGraw covered the song as a duet with Midland for McGraw's 2020 compilation album McGraw Machine Hits: 2013-2019.

Charts

References 
 

1982 singles 
1982 songs
The Bellamy Brothers songs
Blake Shelton songs
Tim McGraw songs
Midland (band) songs
Song recordings produced by Jimmy Bowen
Elektra Records singles
Curb Records singles
Songs written by David Bellamy (singer)